First-move advantage may refer to:
 First-move advantage in chess
 First-mover advantage, a strategy in marketing

See also
 Komidashi, a compensation for first-move advantage in Go